Manuel Benavides is a small town and seat of the municipality of Manuel Benavides, in the northern Mexican state of Chihuahua. As of 2010, the town had a population of 916, up from 200 as of 2005.  It is a rural bordertown on the U.S.-Mexico border, with the town of Redford, Texas, directly opposite, on the U.S. side of the border.

References

Populated places in Chihuahua (state)
Chihuahua (state) populated places on the Rio Grande